Dhak Jagpalpur is a village in Tehsil Phagwara, Kapurthala district, in Punjab, India.

Transport 
Bolinna Junction and Chiheru are the closest railway stations to Dhak Jagpalpur; Jalandhar City railway station is  distant.

References

External links
  Villages in Kapurthala
 Kapurthala Villages List

Villages in Kapurthala district